Sara is a Finnish alternative rock/metal band from Kaskinen established in the mid-1990s by Jorma Korhonen, Antti Tuomivirta, Tommi Koivikko and Kristian Udd. Drummer Eetu Uusitalo was added in 1997. The vocalist Joa Korhonen joined in after winning a talent contest and soon the band was signed to Kråklund Records. In 2005, and after Andreas Backlund joined the band in 2005, they were signed to Universal Records Finland

Career

Their debut album Narupatsaat was released in 2000. Soon Eetu Uusitalo resigned and was replaced by Niko Leminen. The follow-up album Kromi was successfully reaching No. 9 on the Finnish Album Charts, followed by Saattue in 2003 after which the band went into a hiatus. After signing with Universal Finland in 2005, they released their album He kutsuivat luokseen 2006 and Veden äärelle in 2008. Their latest album Se keinuttaa meitä ajassa has proved their most successful making it to No. 4.

Members
The band is made up of:
Joa Korhonen (vocals and guitar)
Tommi Koivikko	(guitar)
Antti Tuomivirta (guitar)
Andreas Bäcklund (drums)
Kristian Udd (bass)

Previous members
Eetu Uusitalo (drums, 1997–2001)
Martti Lindholm (keyboards 2000–2001)
Antti Pitkäjärvi (keyboards, backing vocals 2001–2003)
Niko Leminen (drums 2001–2005)

Discography

Albums

Singles

Other songs and videos
1999: "Silmiin & sydämiin"
2000: "Seuraa"
2001: "Tanssiin"
2002: "KSK"
2003: "Ylimäärä"
2006: "Momentum"
2006: "Vielä muodostan varjoni"
2006: "Huokaus"
2006: "Pyyhit vuodet kasvoiltasi"
2008: "Laine kerrallaan"
2008: "Rauhan aika"
2008: "Pitelet taivasta"
2008: "Kartta rinnassa"
2011: "Yhtenä iltana"
2012: "Se keinuttaa meitä ajassa"

References

External links
Official website
myspace

Finnish heavy metal musical groups